Bovensmilde is a village in the Netherlands' province of Drenthe.

History 
The village was first mentioned in 1847 as Boven-Smilde (literally: Upper-Smilde), and refers to north-eastern part of the peat excavation of Smilde. It was sometimes referred to as Nieuw-Smilde (New Smilde).

Bovensmilde was home to 896 people in 1840. The Dutch Reformed church is an aisleless church built between 1868 and 1869 in neoclassic style. It has a wooden tower.

School hostage crisis 

In 1949, Indonesia became independent, and the Royal Netherlands East Indies Army was disbanded. The islands of Ambon, Buru, and Seram had fought on side of the Netherlands. They were opposed to a Java-dominated Indonesia, and proclaimed the Republic of South Maluku which resulted in an attack by Indonesia. In 1951, 12,000 refugees from South Maluku were temporarily resettled in the Netherlands. They started to feel betrayed, because it developed into permanent exile.

On 23 May 1977, four armed Moluccans occupied an elementary school in Bovensmilde and took 105 children and five teachers as hostages. After five days the children were released. On 11 June, the five remaining teachers were freed when the school was stormed by a Dutch army tank, and the hostage takers were apprehended.

References

Midden-Drenthe
Populated places in Drenthe